Phil Ford is a British television writer and producer. He was head writer and co-producer from the second series of The Sarah Jane Adventures, broadcast in 2008, co-wrote with Russell T Davies "The Waters of Mars", one of the 2009 special episodes of Doctor Who, and wrote the majority of the 2010s video game series Doctor Who: The Adventure Games.

In 2012, with Davies, he created Wizards vs Aliens, which ran for three series and gave him an executive producer credit.

He won a Hugo Award, a Writers' Guild Award and was four-times BAFTA nominated.

Selected filmography

References

External links

Episode 126 - Phil and Dan interview for Starburst magazine's podcast

BBC television producers
British science fiction writers
British soap opera writers
British television writers
Living people
Place of birth missing (living people)
Year of birth missing (living people)
Hugo Award-winning writers